Laura Carter may refer to:
 Laura Carter (musician), American multi-instrumentalist musician
 Laura Carter (actress) (born 1985), English actress and model